The Three Countries Bridge (German: Dreiländerbrücke, French: La passerelle des Trois Pays) is an arch bridge which crosses the Rhine between the commune of Huningue (France) and Weil am Rhein (Germany), within the Basel (Switzerland) metropolitan area. It is the world's longest single-span bridge dedicated exclusively to carrying pedestrians and cyclists.

Its name comes from the bridge's location between France, Germany and Switzerland (which is about  distant). It was designed by the Franco-Austrian architect Dietmar Feichtinger.

Location

The first crossing at this place was built for Huningue Castle and was destroyed by French troops in 1797. The Three Countries Bridge is located at the exact spot where, on 20 October 1944, the Huningue pontoon bridge was destroyed by Allied incendiary bombs. From then until the opening of Palmrainbrücke for road vehicles in 1979, the German federal highway number 532 ended at this point with a car ferry crossing. So as not to block the view from Place Abbatucci (Huningue central square) along the Rue de France and across the river to Weil-am-Rhein Hauptsrasse on the opposite side (and vice versa); the bridge is built just north of the line of these roads.

Construction

Seen in cross-section, the supporting structure is asymmetric. On the up-river side it is a hexagonal cross-section of sheet steel, and downstream are two others; the first is more inclined to the inside and the latter two are bearing the brunt of the load. The building was designed by architect Dietmar Feichtinger, in collaboration with the Büro LAP Leonhardt Andra & Partner (Berlin / Stuttgart).

The construction cost was nine million euros, which were funded by grants from the European Union, the State of Baden-Württemberg, the Haut-Rhin département, and the two neighbouring communities.

The bridge was assembled nearby in Huningue, then transported on 26 November 2006 to its current site on the Rhine. The bridge opened to the public on 30 March 2007, and was officially inaugurated on the night of 30 June − 1 July 2007.

In 2008 it was awarded the German Bridge Construction Prize (Deutscher Brückenbaupreis).

Sources

 Gerhard Mehlhorn (Hrsg.): Handbuch Brücken: Entwerfen, Konstruieren, Berechnen, Bauen und Erhalten, Springer Berlin Heidelberg 2010, 978–3642044229, S. 129.
 Ursula Baus, Mike Schaich: Footbridges, Birkhäuser Verlag, 2007, Seite 176–177.
 http://www.w-wt.de/tourismus_englisch/architektur_und_design_dreilaenderbruecke.html

Notes

References

See also 
 List of bridges in France
 List of bridges in Germany

External links

Information about the bridge from the website of the town of Huningue
Dietmar Feichtinger Architects project page

Arch bridges
Bridges completed in 2007
Bridges over the Rhine
International bridges in France
International bridges in Germany
Pedestrian bridges in France
Pedestrian bridges in Germany
Bridges in Baden-Württemberg
Buildings and structures in Haut-Rhin
Transport in Grand Est
France–Germany border crossings
Cyclist bridges
21st-century architecture in France